Joël Mergui (born 25 February 1958) is a physician and Jewish official. He serves as the president of the Israelite Central Consistory of France. He is a Knight of the Legion of Honour.

References

Living people
1958 births
People from Meknes
Physicians from Paris
20th-century French Jews
20th-century Moroccan Jews
Chevaliers of the Légion d'honneur